KHDV (107.9 FM, "107.9 The Drive") is an American FM radio station licensed by the Federal Communications Commission (FCC) to serve the city of Darby, Montana. It airs a classic hits music format.

The license was the result of an auction held January 31, 2006, which awarded the license for a bid of $178,000. The station was granted its construction permit on June 28, 2006, and received permission to begin full power operation on September 6, 2007.

On September 1, 2013 KHDV changed their format from country to classic hits, branded as "The Drive".

References

External links

Photos of construction of tower and broadcasting equipment

Classic hits radio stations in the United States
Radio stations established in 2007
HDV